David Lopez-Carr is a Professor of Geography at the University of California at Santa Barbara, where he directs the Human-Environment Dynamics Lab (HED) and is an affiliate professor in Global and International Studies and Latin American & Iberian Studies (LAIS). Lopez-Carr also leads the population, health, and environment research group for the Broom Center for Demography and co-directs the Planetary Health Center of Expertise at the University of California Global Health Institute.

Biography
Lopez-Carr had a rural upbringing in New Hampshire and Maine. He graduated from Orono High School and studied abroad for a year in La Palma del Condado, Huelva, Spain. After attending Bates College in 1993 and a brief stint as a legislative assistant for former US Senate Majority Leader, George Mitchell, Lopez-Carr worked in Ecuador on a Fulbright grant. There he worked as a tour guide in the Ecuadorian Amazon and as a Spanish and English translator of Latin American history, poetry and environmental law. He went on to become a graduate researcher with the Carolina Population Center at the University of North Carolina, where he earned a PhD in geography in 2002, followed by a post-doctoral fellowship in biostatistics.

Lopez-Carr speaks six languages: English, Spanish, Portuguese, French, Italian, and Q'eqchi'.

Research
His current research focuses on links among population, health, rural development, agriculture, and marine and forest resource use and conservation. He has ongoing projects in Latin America, Africa, and Asia and has collaborated with conservation and development organizations including WWF, CI, TNC, and the United States Agency for International Development (USAID). He was a lead author on the “Land” and ‘’Drivers’’ chapters for the United Nations Environment Program’s (UNEP) Global Environmental Outlook (Geo-5) published as the UN’s position statement for the Rio de Janeiro 2012 World Summit.

Professional appointments
 Professor, Department of Geography, University of California, Santa Barbara
 Co-director, University of California Global Health Institute Planetary Health Center of Expertise (PHCOE)
 Adjunct Faculty, Department of Geography, San Diego State University
 Director: Population and Environment Research Area, Leonard and Gretchan Broom Center for Demography
 Affiliate Faculty, Global and International Studies; Interdisciplinary Program in Marine Sciences
 Associate Investigator, Santa Barbara Channel (SBC) and Moorea Coral Reef (MCR) Long Term Ecological Research Network (LTER). 2007–present. LTER.

Selected awards and honors 
 Kavli/National Academy of Science Frontiers of Science Fellow (2013)
 American Association for the Advancement of Science (AAAS) Fellow (2014)
 Shared Nobel Peace Prize VIP honoree (2008)
 Harold C. Pillsbury Research Award (2007)
 University of North Carolina Post-doctoral Award for Research Excellence (2004)
 Nystrom Award for best paper based on a dissertation in Geography (2004)
 Fulbright Fellow to Ecuador (1993–95) and Guatemala (1999-2000)
 Mellon Senior Thesis Research Fellow (1992-3)

References 

University of California, Santa Barbara faculty
Living people
Year of birth missing (living people)